State Route 259 (SH-259) is a short state highway within Sigurd in Sevier County, Utah connecting Interstate 70 (I-70)/U.S. Route 89 (US-89) to SR-24.

Route description
From its southern terminus with SR-24, the highway heads northwest and veers more toward the north before meeting Interstate 70/US-89. Two-hundredths of a mile later, the route terminates at a sign indicating the beginning of Federal Route 2570. (Although the entire route is located within the city limits of the Town of Sigurd, the community located in the northern portion of the town was formerly known as Vermillion.)

History
SR-259 was added to the state highway system in 1992 as a connection from the new I-70 to SR-24 (signed as US-89 until 1992). Although the road that continues north from I-70 is the former US-89, SR-259 is not; the original alignment is North State Street, crossing the ca. 1950 bypass (now SR-118) into SR-24.

Major intersections

See also

 Interstate 70 in Utah
 Sigurd, Utah
 U.S. Route 89 in Utah
 Utah State Route 24
 Utah State Route 259 (1957-1977)

References

External references

259
 259